So Long Letty is a 1929 American pre-Code musical comedy directed by Lloyd Bacon and starring Charlotte Greenwood, reprising her role from the 1916 Broadway stage play. The story had previously been filmed as a silent under the same title in 1920 with Colleen Moore.

Plot
Uncle Claude comes to the Ardmore Beach Hotel to see Tommy and his wife. At the hotel, with his two granddaughters Ruth and Sally, Uncle Claude meets a wise-talking employee named Letty, which causes him to leave the hotel. When he finds Tommy, he mistakes Grace for his wife and likes her and the way she keeps a clean house. To get a big check from Uncle Claude and to see how life is with the other, the two couples switch spouses for a week.

Cast
 Charlotte Greenwood as Letty Robbins
 Claude Gillingwater as Uncle Claude
 Grant Withers as Harry Miller
 Patsy Ruth Miller as Grace Miller
 Bert Roach as Tommy Robbins
 Marion Byron as Ruth Davis
 Helen Foster as Sally Davis
 Hallam Cooley as Clarence de Brie
 Harry Gribbon as Joe Casey
 Lloyd Ingraham as Judge

See also
 List of early Warner Bros. sound and talking features

Release and reception
The film premiered on October 16, 1929.  Film historian Scott Eyman, in his book The Speed of Sound, wrote that the film was one of a wave of more than 70 musicals inundating American movie theaters in 1930.  Like most of its genre at the time, it was financially disappointing and "barely broke even", despite the "glorious rowdy Charlotte Greenwood", Eyman said.

References

External links
 
 
 
 

1929 films
American films based on plays
Films directed by Lloyd Bacon
Warner Bros. films
American musical comedy films
1929 musical comedy films
American black-and-white films
Films scored by Louis Silvers
Remakes of American films
Sound film remakes of silent films
1920s English-language films
1920s American films